In mathematics, a concave function is the negative of a convex function. A concave function is also synonymously called concave downwards, concave down, convex upwards, convex cap, or upper convex.

Definition

A function is called strictly concave if

A function  is quasiconcave if the upper contour sets of the function  are convex sets.

Properties

Functions of a single variable
 A differentiable function  is (strictly) concave on an interval if and only if its derivative function   is (strictly) monotonically decreasing on that interval, that is, a concave function has a non-increasing (decreasing) slope.
 Points where concavity changes (between concave and convex) are inflection points.
 If  is twice-differentiable, then  is concave if and only if  is non-positive (or, informally, if the "acceleration" is non-positive).
 If  is concave and differentiable, then it is bounded above by its first-order Taylor approximation: 
Proof:
 For :

Functions of n variables
 A function  is concave over a convex set if and only if the function   is a convex function over the set.
 The sum of two concave functions is itself concave and so is the pointwise minimum of two concave functions, i.e. the set of concave functions on a given domain form a semifield.
 Near a strict local maximum in the interior of the domain of a function, the function must be concave; as a partial converse, if the derivative of a strictly concave function is zero at some point, then that point is a local maximum.
 Any local maximum of a concave function is also a global maximum. A strictly concave function will have at most one global maximum.

Examples
 The logarithm function  is concave on its domain , as its derivative  is a strictly decreasing function.
 Any affine function  is both concave and convex, but neither strictly-concave nor strictly-convex.
 The sine function is concave on the interval .
 The function , where  is the determinant of a nonnegative-definite matrix B, is concave.

Applications
 Rays bending in the computation of radiowave attenuation in the atmosphere involve concave functions.
 In expected utility theory for choice under uncertainty, cardinal utility functions of risk averse decision makers are concave. 
 In microeconomic theory, production functions are usually assumed to be concave over some or all of their domains, resulting in diminishing returns to input factors.

See also
 Concave polygon
 Jensen's inequality
 Logarithmically concave function
 Quasiconcave function
 Concavification

References

Further References

Convex analysis
Types of functions